The West African National Secretariat (WANS) was a Pan-Africanist movement founded by Kwame Nkrumah, based in Britain.

Nkrumah founded WANS in December 1945, immediately following the Manchester Pan-African Congress, becoming the new organisation's Secretary-General.  Other founder members included I. T. A. Wallace-Johnson (who was elected as Chairman), Bankole Akpata, Kojo Botsio and Bankole Awooner-Renner (the first President).  Many of its initial members were also members of the West African Students' Union (WASU).

WANS aimed to build a united movement throughout West Africa for independence, on a platform of anti-imperialism.  Its view of West Africa was broad, and aimed to include countries as distant as Kenya and Sudan.  A major congress was planned, but never came to fruition.

Within WANS, Nkrumah organised a secret socialist revolutionary group, known as "The Circle".  This group worked closely with the Communist Party of Great Britain.

During 1946, WANS published five issues of a monthly journal, The New African, containing articles in English, French and Belgian, on West African issues, but also incorporating stories from the Moscow New Times.  In September, WANS held a joint conference with WASU, which Nkrumah convinced Léopold Sédar Senghor and Sourou Migan Apithy to attend.

WANS was considerably weakened after Nkrumah returned to Africa in 1947, and appears to have dissolved the following year.

References
Hakim Adi, West Africans in Britain: 1900-1960, London: Lawrence and Wishart, 1998, 
Daryl Zizwe Poe, Kwame Nkrumah's Contribution to Pan-Africanism: An Afrocentric Analysis, Routledge, 2003, 

Politics of West Africa
Defunct socialist parties in the United Kingdom
Pan-Africanist organizations
Organizations established in 1945
Pan-Africanism in the United Kingdom
British West Africa